Fluorodopa, also known as FDOPA, is a fluorinated form of L-DOPA primarily synthesized as its fluorine-18 isotopologue for use as a radiotracer in positron emission tomography (PET).

The most common side effects are injection site pain.

Medical uses 
Fluorodopa is indicated for use in positron emission tomography (PET) to visualize dopaminergic nerve terminals in the striatum for the evaluation of adults with suspected Parkinsonian syndromes (PS).

History 
In October 2019, Fluorodopa was approved in the United States for the visual detection of certain nerve cells in adult patients with suspected Parkinsonian Syndromes (PS).

The U.S. Food and Drug Administration (FDA) approved Fluorodopa F 18 based on evidence from one clinical trial of 56 patients with suspected PS. The trial was conducted at one clinical site in the United States.

References

External links
 

Catecholamines
Radiopharmaceuticals
Extrapyramidal and movement disorders